Heini Halberstam (11 September 1926 – 25 January 2014) was a Czech-born British mathematician, working in the field of analytic number theory. He is remembered in part for the Elliott–Halberstam conjecture from 1968.

Life and career
Halberstam was born in Most, Czechoslovakia 
and died in Champaign, Illinois, US. His father died when he was very young. After Adolf Hitler's annexation of the Sudetenland, he and his mother moved to Prague. At the age of twelve, as the Nazi occupation progressed, he was one of the 669 children saved by Sir Nicholas Winton, who organized the Kindertransport, a train that allowed those children to leave Nazi-occupied territory. He was sent to England, where he lived during World War II.

He obtained his PhD in 1952, from University College, London, under supervision of Theodor Estermann. From 1962 until 1964, Halberstam was Erasmus Smith's Professor of Mathematics at Trinity College Dublin;  From 1964 until 1980, Halberstam was a Professor of Mathematics at the University of Nottingham. In 1980, he took up a position at the University of Illinois Urbana-Champaign (UIUC) and became an Emeritus Professor at UIUC in 1996. In 2012, he became a fellow of the American Mathematical Society.

He is known also for books, Sequences with Klaus Roth on additive number theory, and with H. E. Richert on sieve theory.

References 

1926 births
2014 deaths
20th-century English mathematicians
21st-century English mathematicians
Czech Jews
Number theorists
Academics of the University of Nottingham
Fellows of the American Mathematical Society
Kindertransport refugees
University of Illinois Urbana-Champaign faculty
Alumni of University College London
Donegall Lecturers of Mathematics at Trinity College Dublin
People from Most (city)
University of Illinois faculty
English emigrants to the United States
Czechoslovak emigrants to England